Sveinn Thorvaldson (March 3, 1872 – July 14, 1949) was a politician in Manitoba, Canada. He served in the Legislative Assembly of Manitoba from 1914 to 1915, as a member of the Conservative Party.

Biography 
Thorvaldson was born in Iceland, and came to Canada in 1887. He was educated at public schools, and at the Collegiate Institute of Winnipeg. He married Margerate Solmunson on April 13, 1896, and they had twelve children.

He worked as a merchant and was secretary-treasurer of Sigurdson and Thorvaldson Company Ltd. Thorvaldson served as reeve for the Rural Municipality of Gimli from 1903 to 1905 and for the Rural Municipality of Bifrost from 1908 to 1914, from 1922 to 1926 and from 1929 to 1930. In religion, he was a Unitarian.

He was elected to the Manitoba legislature in the 1914 provincial election, defeating Liberal candidate Einar Jonasson and Independent-Liberal Taras Ferley in the constituency of Gimli. The Conservatives won a majority government, and Thorvaldson served as a backbench supporter of Rodmond Roblin's government.

In 1915, the Roblin administration was forced to resign from office amid a serious corruption scandal. A new election was called, which the Liberal Party won in a landslide. Thorvaldson lost the Gimli constituency to Ferley by 610 votes.

In 1934, he became a member of the civil list of the Order of the British Empire and, in 1939, a member of the Icelandic Order of the Falcon.

He died in Winnipeg in 1949.

Thorvaldson's son, Gunnar S. Thorvaldson, also served in the assembly from 1941 to 1949.

References 

1872 births
1949 deaths
Progressive Conservative Party of Manitoba MLAs
Icelandic emigrants to Canada
Canadian people of Icelandic descent
Canadian Unitarians